Adhaura is a village and corresponding community development block in Kaimur district of Bihar, India. As of 2011, its population was 2,961, in 550 households. The total block population was 57,100, in 9,857 households. It is the least populated block in Kaimur district.

Geography 
Adhaura is located 58 km from Bhabua, the Kaimur district headquarters, in a hilly and forested area.

Demographics 
As of 2011, the sex ratio of Adhaura block was 926 females to every 1000 males. The sex ratio among the 0-6 age bracket was 958. Members of scheduled castes made up 12.93% of the block's population (the lowest proportion in the district) and members of scheduled tribes made up 51.98% (the highest in the district). The block's literacy rate was 56.34%, the lowest in Kaimur district. Male literacy was 68.96% and female literacy was 42.59%, with the corresponding 26.37% gender literacy gap being the highest in the district.

Most of Adhaura block's workforce was employed in agriculture in 2011, with 23.45% of workers being cultivators who owned or leased their own land and another 65.05% being agricultural labourers who worked someone else's land for wages. 2.99% were household industry workers, and the remaining 8.51% were other workers.

Villages 
Adhaura block contains the following villages:

References 

Villages in Kaimur district